Galala is a small town in Kurdistan Region in Iraq, about 9 km west of Choman.

References

External links
 Hawler gov.

Cities in Iraqi Kurdistan
Populated places in Erbil Governorate
Kurdish settlements in Iraq